The Lorraine 14A Antarès was a French 14-cylinder radial aero engine built and used in the 1930s.  It was rated in the  range.

Design and development
The Antarès was a conventionally laid out radial engine, with 14 cylinders in two rows.  The crankcase was a barrel-shaped aluminium alloy casting, with an internal integral diaphragm which held the front crankshaft bearing.  Forward of the diaphragm there was an integrally cast cam-gear case for the double track cam-rings.  The reduction gear was housed under a domed casing attached to the front of the crankcase.

Flange-mounted steel barrels were bolted to the crankcase and enclosed with cast aluminium alloy, screwed-on, cylinder heads with integral cooling fins. The pistons were also made of aluminium alloy and had floating gudgeon pins. The fourteen pistons drove the double throw crankshaft via two channel-section master rods and twelve circular section auxiliary rods.  The master rod had an integral, split type big-end. The crankshaft was machined from a single forging, with bolt-on balance weights.

The Antarès had a single pair of overhead inlet and exhaust valves per cylinder. The cam-rings drove roller tappets, mounted in the cam-case, which in turn operated rocker arms, fitted with ball bearings, via pushrods.  The cam-rings were concentric with the crankshaft and driven via epicyclic gears. Most Antarès were conventionally aspirated via a single carburettor.

Variants
14A
14Ac
14E
14L

Specifications

References

1930s aircraft piston engines
Aircraft air-cooled radial piston engines
Antares